San Antonio Abad is a station on Line 2 of the Mexico City Metro system. It is located in the Colonia Tránsito and Colonia Obrera neighborhoods of the Cuauhtémoc borough of Mexico City, to the south of the city centre, in the median of Calzada San Antonio Abad.

General information
The station logo depicts Saint Anthony the Great, after the monastery dedicated to him that was established in the area after the Spanish conquest of Tenochtitlán. The section of the avenue on which the station sits is also called after him, but due south it later becomes Calzada de Tlalpan.

Metro San Antonio Abad is the first street-level station on the southern section of Line 2.  The station opened on 1 August 1970.

Ridership

Exits
East: Avenida San Antonio Abad and Manuel Gutiérrez Nájera street, Colonia Tránsito
West: Avenida San Antonio Abad between Manuel M. Flores street and José Joaquín Arriaga street, Colonia Obrera

See also 
 List of Mexico City metro stations

References

External links 

San Antonio Abad
Railway stations opened in 1970
1970 establishments in Mexico
Mexico City Metro stations in Cuauhtémoc, Mexico City
Accessible Mexico City Metro stations